Winston Enriquillo Llenas Dávila (a.k.a. Chilote) (born September 23, 1943) is a former Major League Baseball infielder/outfielder who played for the California Angels from 1968 to 1969, and again from 1972 to 1975. He also played one season in Japan for the Taiheiyo Club Lions in 1976.

Early life and family
Llenas was born to Rafael Antonio Llenas Díaz (the son of Enrique Llenas Domínguez and Mercedes Díaz Andreu) and Magda Aracelis Dávila; he had 4 brothers and 5 sisters. Winston’s paternal grandparents had Catalan roots.

Career
Llenas signed with the Kansas City Athletics as an amateur free agent before the 1961 season, then was released by them on June 16, 1962.  He had played in 153 games for the A's organization in the Sophomore League and the Florida State League, batting .232 and committing 60 errors.  About  months later, at age 19, he signed as a free agent with the Los Angeles Angels. (December 2, 1962)

As Llenas grew older, he became a solid minor league hitter. He made his major league debut on August 15, 1968 against the Washington Senators at Anaheim Stadium.  He started at third base, batted sixth in the lineup, and went 1-for-3 with a double and a run scored in a 3–1 win over starting pitcher Frank Bertaina. Typically, he made a throwing error on the first ground ball hit to him.

His best season was 1973, when he led the American League in pinch-hits (16) and pinch-hit at-bats (56).  He also had career highs in games played (78), batting average (.269), and runs batted in (25).  He was used quite often as a pinch-hitter throughout his MLB career.  The most games he started at any one position was at third base.  His best position, however, was second base, where he handled 111 total chances without making a single error.

Career totals for 300 games include a .230 batting average (122-for-531), 3 HR, 61 RBI, and 50 runs scored.

In the Dominican Winter League he has been a champion in 19 of the 20 crowns of Aguilas Cibaeñas as a player, manager, general manager and president.

In 2008, Llenas gained induction into the Caribbean Baseball Hall of Fame as part of its 12th Class.

Facts
Pinch-hitting for Nolan Ryan with two out in the bottom of the 9th against Milwaukee Brewers starter Earl Stephenson, banged a walk-off single to right to win the game, 1–0. {Anaheim Stadium—July 5, 1972}
Hit a combined .323 (20-for-62) against All-Star pitchers Vida Blue, Jim Kaat, Sparky Lyle, Mel Stottlemyre, and Wilbur Wood

Minor league highlights
Hit .346 for the Tri-City Angels of the Northwest League in 1964
Tied for the Texas League lead in home runs with 25 while playing for the El Paso Sun Kings in 1966
Led the Mexican League with 113 RBI while playing for the Charros de Jalisco in 1967
Led the Pacific Coast League with 108 RBI while playing for the Hawaii Islanders in 1970

References

1975 Baseball Register published by The Sporting News

External links

Winston Llenas - Baseball Biography
The Baseball Archive (Mexican League franchises 1949–1981)

1943 births
Living people
Águilas Cibaeñas players
Albuquerque Dukes players
Broncos de Reynosa players
Cafeteros de Córdoba players
Caribbean Series managers
California Angels players
Charros de Jalisco players
Cleveland Indians scouts
Daytona Beach Islanders players
Diablos Rojos del México players
Dominican Republic expatriate baseball players in Japan
Dominican Republic expatriate baseball players in the United States
Dominican Republic people of Canarian descent
Dominican Republic people of Catalan descent
El Paso Sun Kings players
Hawaii Islanders players
Major League Baseball infielders
Major League Baseball outfielders
Major League Baseball players from the Dominican Republic
Mexican League baseball managers
Minor league baseball managers
Nashua Angels players
Quad Cities Angels players
Salt Lake City Angels players
Salt Lake City Gulls players
Seattle Angels players
Taiheiyo Club Lions players
Tri-City Angels players
Dominican Republic expatriate baseball players in Mexico